Ng Teng Fong General Hospital (NTFGH) is a 700-bed hospital located in Jurong East, Singapore. Named after Singaporean late entrepreneur, Ng Teng Fong, the hospital is part of an integrated development together with the adjoining Jurong Community Hospital. It began operations on 30 June 2015 after JurongHealth's move from Alexandra Hospital and was officially opened on 10 October that year.

History

Construction 
Construction of the hospital started in 2012 and had cost about SGD 1 billion to build. The hospital was planned together with the Jurong Community Hospital to cater to the residents living in the Western part of Singapore and it will comprise 8 levels of specialist clinics upon completion.

Delay in completion
The completion of the hospital was delayed by 6 months due to problems with the production of materials needed for the exterior of the hospital. Due to the delay, Alexandra Hospital, which was due to close temporarily for renovation once the hospital is completed, remained operational till construction of the hospital is complete. Later, it was announced that the hospital would open on 30 June 2015.

Opening 
The hospital commenced operations on 30 June 2015.

On 10 October that year, Ng Teng Fong General Hospital, along with Jurong Community Hospital, was officially opened at JurongHealth's Health Carnival, by guest-of-honour Prime Minister Lee Hsien Loong.

References

External links
 Ng Teng Fong General Hospital
 Ministry of Health Press Release

Hospitals in Singapore
Jurong East
2015 establishments in Singapore